Carmen Raquel Yánez Machado (born 2 April 1986) known as Raquel Yánez, is a Venezuelan  telenovela actress and model.

Biography
Raquel's acting career started when she was undergoing her studies in the School of Arts at Universidad Central de Venezuela. She spent 3 years studying dance at the Instituto Universitario de Danza and IX Taller de Jóvenes Artistas del Grupo Theja.

Her first work was released under the name El Público, thus giving her more exposure to the world of acting.

In 2012, she interpreted the role of a villain in the telenovela Válgame Dios as Nieves Pérez, a firefighter.

Filmography

Films
 El hijo de mi marido y sin prurito alguno (2013)

Telenovelas
 Mi prima Ciela (2007) as Silvia Constanza Toscani Ávila
 Nadie me dirá como quererte (2008) as Rita Monasterios
 Libres como el viento (2009) as Amarelis Sarmiento
 La Banda (Boomerang) (2011) as Veronica
 Válgame Dios (2012) as Nieves Pérez
 Dulce Amargo (2013) as Gatúbela
 Entre tu amor y mi amor (2016) as Yuliska Galindo

Theater
 El Público (2003/2004)
 Día Internacional de la Danza (2004)
 Prometeo Encadenado (2005)
 Autorretrato de Artista Con Barba Y Pumpa (2006)
 '' (2012)

References

External links

Living people
1986 births
Actresses from Caracas
Venezuelan film actresses
Venezuelan stage actresses
Venezuelan telenovela actresses